Wilhelm Schneider-Didam (14 May 1869 – 5 April 1923) was a German portrait painter of the Düsseldorf school of painting.

Life 
Born in Altenhundem, Province of Westphalia, Schneider-Didam first attended the painting and drawing school of the Kölnisches Stadtmuseum in 1886/1887. From 1887 to 1893, he then studied at the Kunstakademie Düsseldorf. There, Hugo Crola, Johann Peter Theodor Janssen and especially the portrait painter Julius Roeting were his teachers. 

In 1894, he made his debut in his first exhibition, which was held in the Galerie Eduard Schulte in Düsseldorf. Through portraits of fellow artists, Schneider-Didam soon gained a reputation as a painter of excellent portraits of gentlemen. Until his death he lived in Düsseldorf, where he was a member of the artists' association Laetitia and the Malkasten. 

Together with Eugen Kampf, he ran a private painting school for women, the Damenakademien München und Berlin und Malerinnenschule Karlsruhe, which was initially located at Jacobistraße 14a, and later, in the early 20th century, in the so-called Hungerturm, also known as the Eiskellerberg, opposite the Academy of Arts.

Schneider-Didam died in Düsseldorf at the age of 53.

Work 
 Clemens Buscher, portrait, 1897, Buscher-Museum, Gamburg
 Der Kunstkritiker, 1901
 Fritz von Wille, Portrait, 1909, Fritz-von-Wille-Museum, Bitburg

Exhibitions (selection) 
 “Mal doch!“ Andreas Dirks (1865–1922), Sylt Museum, Keitum / Sylt, Andreas Dirks with Eugen Dücker, Theodor von Hagen, Leopold Graf von Kalckreuth, Wilhelm Schneider-Didam, Alexander Essfeld and Ingo Kühl, 2022.

References

Further reading 
 Schneider-Didam, Wilhelm. In Hans Vollmer (ed.): Allgemeines Lexikon der Bildenden Künstler von der Antike bis zur Gegenwart. Created by Ulrich Thieme and Felix Becker. vol. 30: Scheffel–Siemerding. E. A. Seemann, Leipzig 1936, .
 Hans Paffrath (ed.): Lexikon der Düsseldorfer Malerschule 1819–1918. Vol. 3: Nabert–Zwecker. Herausgegeben vom Kunstmuseum Düsseldorf im Ehrenhof und von der Galerie Paffrath. Bruckmann, Munich 1998, .
 Friedrich Schaarschmidt: Zur Geschichte der Düsseldorfer Kunst, insbesondere im XIX. Jahrhundert. Kunstverein für die Rheinlande und Westfalen, Düsseldorf 1902, .

External links 

 Wilhelm Schneider-Didam, Biography in Portal deutschefotothek.de (Deutsche Fotothek)
 Wilhelm Schneider-Didam, Datenblatt in Portal rkd.nl (Netherlands Institute for Art History)

19th-century German painters
19th-century German male artists
20th-century German painters
20th-century German male artists
German portrait painters
1869 births
1923 deaths
Artists from North Rhine-Westphalia